Lucílio de Albuquerque (9 May 1877 – 19 April 1939) was a Brazilian painter, designer and art professor.

Biography 
His father was a magistrate. After a brief period of studying law at the Faculdade de Direito da Universidade de São Paulo, he enrolled at the Escola Nacional de Belas Artes (ENBA), where he studied under  João Zeferino da Costa, Rodolfo Amoedo and Henrique Bernardelli.

In 1906, his painting "Anchieta escrevendo o poema à Virgem" (Anchieta Writing the Poem to the Virgin) won him ENBA's "Travel Award". Soon after, he and his new bride Georgina (a classmate) left for France, where they remained for five years. While there, he attended the Académie Julian, where he studied with Marcel Baschet, Henri Royer and Jean-Paul Laurens. He also worked in the studios of Eugène Grasset and had a small exhibition at the Salon.

Upon their return to Brazil in 1911, they held joint exhibitions at ENBA, where Lucílio became a Professor of Figure Drawing and was appointed to a chair in 1916. Over the next decade, he received many awards at the "". He became the Director of ENBA in 1937, but resigned a year later due to poor health.

Best known for his portraits and landscapes, he also designed the stained-glass windows for the Brazilian Pavilion at the Turin International and did decorative paintings for the Palácio Pedro Ernesto.

After his death, Georgina turned their home in Laranjeiras into the "Museu Lucílio de Albuquerque".

Gallery

References

Further reading
 Luís de Albuquerque, Lucílio de Albuquerque: exposicao retropectiva (Exhibition catalog), Museu Nacional de Belas Artes, Serviço Gráfico do Ministério da Educação e Saude, 1940

External links 

 "Lucílio de Albuquerque na arte brasileira", by Piedade Epstein Grinberg @ DezeNoveVinte

1877 births
1939 deaths
Landscape painters
20th-century Brazilian painters
20th-century Brazilian male artists
Académie Julian alumni
Brazilian expatriates in France